Avalon Airport  is an international airport located in Avalon in the City of Greater Geelong in Victoria, Australia. While located outside the Melbourne metropolitan area, it is the second busiest of the four airports serving the state capital in passenger traffic. The airport is operated by Avalon Airport Australia Pty Ltd, a subsidiary of Linfox.

Avalon is currently served by passenger airlines Jetstar, which began domestic flights in 2004, and Bonza, which began service at the airport on February 21, 2023. The airport is also the site of the biennial Australian International Airshow.

Unlike Melbourne Airport, Avalon Airport is not governed by the Commonwealth's Airports Act 1996. The airport has a single runway in addition to a helipad.

History
The airport is located on land of the original indigenous owners, the Wathaurong people, and a scatter stone area is preserved on the Avalon Airport site, out of respect for the original owners. The land has undergone many changes over the past century.

In the beginning, the airport was a sheep and cattle farm and homestead, founded by James Austin, an immigrant from Glastonbury, Somerset, England. James established his farm and named the homestead "Avalon" after the isle of Avalon at Glastonbury, the mythical island in the Arthurian legend. In 1952 the Commonwealth Government bought  at Avalon for just 110 pounds, as the land was deemed to be of poor quality farmland due to the abundance of volcanic rock littering the surface.

The airport was opened in 1953, to cater for the production of military aircraft. Previously, the Government Aircraft Factories at Fishermans Bend, Melbourne had used a runway beside the factory. However, newer jet aircraft required a longer runway for safe operations, and the Fisherman's Bend runway was being encroached upon by development.

A  runway was built by Country Roads Board, with the first plane landing on 3 April 1953 – a four-engined Avro Lincoln heavy bomber flown from Fishermans Bend. The English Electric Canberra light bomber was under construction at same time at the new airport. In 1959, Qantas established a training base at the site.

In 1961, Government Aircraft Factories combined with the Commonwealth Aircraft Corporation, and built and serviced 110 Mirage fighters at the site, and in 1970 Jindivik Target Aircraft transferred to Avalon Airport from Fishermens Bend, adding production of 170 Nomad and 75 Hornet military jets, in addition to servicing of other jets.

In 1985 the Government Aircraft Factories changed its name to Aerospace Technologies of Australia (ASTA). Aircraft produced during this time included the GAF Jindivik remotely piloted aircraft, and Nomad civil aircraft. Under the ASTA banner, engines for the Dassault Mirage III jet fighters were produced, as well as assembly of the F/A-18 multirole combat aircraft for the Royal Australian Air Force (RAAF).

In October 1988, the ASTA Aircraft Services division took the first Boeing 747 to Avalon for servicing and maintenance. By December 1993, fifty 747 aircraft had been through the Avalon facility, and 820 people were employed at the site. October 1995 saw a Cathay Pacific Lockheed L-1011 flown to Avalon for scrapping by ASTA Aircraft Services, in what was a one-off event.

Training of pilots from Japan's All Nippon Airways commenced at the airport on 8 September 1993.

On 27 June 1995 Aerospace Technologies of Australia was privatised by the Commonwealth Government, selling the aircraft divisions to Rockwell Australia Limited, and the airport operations to Avalon Airport Geelong Pty Ltd. The ASTA airliner overhauling facility was closed in 1997.

The first scheduled passenger flights out of the airport were operated by Hazelton Airlines, who commenced flights between Avalon Airport and Sydney in February 1995. 36-seat Saab 340 aircraft were used for the service. The service was discontinued after a short time due to a lack of passengers.

Post-privatisation
In 1997, the federal Government of Australia, through the Department of Defence, granted Linfox a 50-year plus a 49-year option lease of the airport. Between 1997 and 2001 Linfox developed proposals to develop the land which formed the basis of the Avalon Airport Master Plan draft, 2013. In 1992, the airport began hosting the Australian International Airshow.

On 1 June 2004, Jetstar started commercial flights from the airport, in addition to their operations at Melbourne Airport.

In April 2010, Tigerair Australia announced it would base two aircraft and commence operations from Avalon later that year. By June 2011 however, Tigerair Australia announced it would be withdrawing several flights from Avalon, to be operated instead from Melbourne Airport. The remaining Tigerair Australia services were withdrawn after a series of incidents that led to airline's operations being suspended by the Civil Aviation Safety Authority the following month.

In October 2012, the Federal Government announced that the airport's lease would be amended, allowing for the construction of a new terminal and the implementation of international flights. Avalon is the second airport in Victoria to be designated as a port of entry for freight operations.

In February 2022, Bonza announced that the airport would become one of its 17 destinations with the airline planning to fly to the Sunshine Coast from Avalon.

International flights 
It was announced on 4 February 2018 that AirAsia X would move their Melbourne Airport operations to Avalon Airport by the end of the year. AirAsia X Airbus A330s would service the twice daily direct flights to Kuala Lumpur. Announcing it on 10 July 2018 the airline commenced its operations from Avalon Airport on 5 December 2018.
 
A media release on 22 October 2019 from the Victorian Premier's Office stated that VietJet Air was expected to begin flights from Avalon to Vietnam in the second half of 2020.

On 11 December 2019, it was announced on Citilink's Instagram social media account that flights to Denpasar (Bali), Indonesia would be added to Avalon Airport's list of international flights. On 10 January 2020, it was stated that the daily flight would commence on 24 January 2020.

On 18 July 2022, Air Asia announced they would be restarting flights to Australia and New Zealand but will be ending their Avalon operations and begin operating out of Melbourne Airport for the first time since 2018.

Future

Airport Master Plan 2015
The Avalon Airport Master Plan was prepared by Avalon Airport Pty Ltd in September 2015 and was endorsed by the Department of Defence. The document provides for a significant expansion of the airport's operations, as well as the establishment of non-aviation related developments.

Proposed rail connection
On 3 May 2011, the Victorian Minister for Public Transport committed $3 million for the planning of a rail link to Avalon Airport. In January 2013, three route options were presented. The railway line would start by running along the existing Geelong-Melbourne heavy rail corridor, and then divert towards Avalon Airport, south of Little River, at one of three locations. The eastern option would see the line break away closer to Melbourne, near Cherry Swamp Road and Little River. The central option would place the diversion 2.5 kilometres southwest, near Peak School Road at Lara. The western route option would divert from the existing line closer to Geelong, at Plains Road, Lara. Each of the three routes would run over the Princes Freeway, north east of the Beach Road interchange at Little River, running under the flight path to a new station inside the terminal. The government would need to acquire private farmland to complete the link and is considering a number different options, including a light rail service, automated driverless trains used at several international airports.

On 4 August 2013, the state government indicated that it may alter its election promise to build the $250 million train line to Avalon Airport, and instead create a cheaper light rail link from Melbourne's south-west. Department documents show the government is now considering other options to meet interim demand, such as light rail, buses, or "driverless transport options which are used at many airports around the world".

Facilities
Over $100 million has been invested in the airport thus far to complete the following:

 An apron expansion to accommodate a further four aircraft as well as enable the opportunity to accommodate an aircraft the size of a Boeing 747.
 A total of seven A320 sized aircraft can now be parked simultaneously in front of the airport terminal.
 Installation of a flight information display system
 Fuel farm expansion to triple storage capacity from 500,000 to 1,500,000 litres of A1 jet fuel plus installation of new fuel pipelines
 Construction of a new bus, taxi and hire car road and various rerouted roads to manage incoming passenger traffic and other road infrastructure upgrades
 Fuel farm electrical maintenance and demolition of unused buildings
 Significant infrastructure upgrades as part of the Australian International Airshow

Passenger terminal 
In its present configuration, the terminal can accommodate around six domestic departures per hour. The airport has a total of eight aircraft parking bays; there are six on the Northern Apron and two on the Eastern Apron. On the Northern Apron, the airport can accommodate five Code C Aircraft (Boeing 737 or Airbus A320 aircraft) and one Boeing 747.

Avalon Airport can accommodate two Boeing 747s or two Boeing 787s on the Eastern Apron. The Eastern Apron is also a remote parking bay which doubles as a freight bay. The airport is capable of fitting one Airbus A380 at a time on the Eastern Apron; this means it can also accommodate the freighter version of the Boeing 747-8, which is slightly smaller.

Currently the airport terminal is not equipped with aerobridges, and does not feature any guest lounges.

Freight facilities
The most notable freight operations include the Australian Grand Prix, Supercars and Superbikes, plus some specialist charters including livestock race horses, fresh produce, military hardware, touring rock bands. The airport can facilitate loads on all aircraft types from the Airbus 380 series down, with equipment available to load via the main deck, lower deck, nose or tail end of the Aircraft, with a maximum lift of 16 tonnes. It has three dedicated freighter parking positions: Two on its Eastern and one on the Northern Freighter Aprons.

Aircraft heavy maintenance
Avalon Airport has six hangars in total:  of hangar space, including three Boeing 747 hangars. Three of these are customised B747 hangars that were used by Qantas. The Qantas Engineering maintenance facility commenced operations on 13 May 1998.

It was also responsible for the Qantas Group's aircraft commercial project work, including cabin reconfigurations and refurbishment.

The Avalon Maintenance Facility was the first in Australia to develop and carry out a program for converting B737-300 passenger aircraft to freighters for Australian Air Express operations and was responsible for the modification of the new Premium Economy product for Qantas' B747-400 fleet.

In 2012, Qantas announced that it would phase out operations at Avalon Airport, making the hangars available for other businesses.

Airlines and destinations

Other uses
The video clip of Human Nature's 2000 song He Don't Love You was filmed at the airport.

In July 2013, it was proposed by Geelong City Council that a theme park be built at Avalon, and they have held discussions with Village Roadshow and other companies concerning the proposal. African Safari World was a previous proposal at nearby Werribee Zoo that did not get approved.

The biennial Australian International Airshow operates from Avalon Airport. The project is owned by Aviation Development Australia Limited. The event attracts a total attendance of over 195,000 across the six days, including exhibitors from the international aerospace industry and government, military, scientific and trade delegates.

Ground transportation

Car
Avalon Airport is linked to Geelong and Melbourne by the adjacent Princes Freeway. The airport has 1,500 airport car spaces, a taxi rank and a ride-share pick-up/drop-off bay.

Coach
In 2017, Skybus launched services from the Melbourne CBD and Geelong to Avalon Airport.

Accidents and incidents
On 6 August 1976, a prototype N24 Nomad crashed shortly after takeoff at Avalon while a flight test of modifications to the tail of the aircraft. Two of the three crew members were killed in the accident, notably including pilot Stuart Pearce, father of actor Guy Pearce.
A serious incident involving a Tiger Airways Australia Airbus A320 flight from Sydney occurred on 30 June 2011 when the crew performed a missed approach at Avalon outside of published procedures, resulting in the aircraft overflying the Geelong suburb of Leopold at a dangerously low altitude, without guidance from Air Traffic Control. The incident made national headlines and triggered a five-week grounding of the airline over a busy school holiday period while a safety audit was conducted by the Civil Aviation Safety Authority.

See also
Melbourne Airport rail link
Commonwealth Aircraft Corporation
List of airports in Victoria
Transport in Australia

References

Bibliography
Peter Begg (1990). Geelong — The First 150 Years. Globe Press.

External links

Australian International Airshow
Street Map

Airports in Victoria (Australia)
1953 establishments in Australia
Airports established in 1953
Transport in Geelong
Buildings and structures in Geelong